Ramenye is a rural locality (a village) and the administrative center of Ramenskoye Rural Settlement, Syamzhensky District, Vologda Oblast, Russia. The population was 308 as of 2002. There are 8 streets.

Geography 
Ramenye is located 40 km north of Syamzha (the district's administrative centre) by road. Kharitonovskaya is the nearest locality. рамень- shoulder in Slavic languages. River Valga in Sanskrit blooming

References 

Rural localities in Syamzhensky District